Galicia (L51) is a  (LPD) of the Spanish Navy and is the seventh ship to bear this name. She is the lead ship in her class. The vessel was constructed in Ferrol, Spain and launched in 1997 and commissioned in 1998. Galicia is tasked with transporting Spanish marines, humanitarian aid missions and general logistic support. The LPD has taken part in actions against piracy in the Indian Ocean and off the Somalian coast, provided humanitarian aid following hurricanes and tsunamis and provided support during the COVID-19 pandemic in Spain.

Design and description
The project began in the Netherlands in 1990 as that country sought a solution to their LPD requirements. Spain joined the project in July 1991 and the definition stage was completed by December 1993. The Galicia class spawned from the joint Enforcer design with Spain's lead ship being authorised on 29 July 1994. The LPDs were designed to transport a battalion of marines and disembark them offshore and general logistic support.

The ships have a  electric plant comprising four diesel generators capable of creating  and an emergency  generator.

The Galicia class have a  flight deck capable of operating helicopters. The vessels have hangar area for four heavy or six medium helicopters. The LPDs usually sail with six AB 212 or four SH-3D helicopters embarked. They have a  well deck and are capable of operating six landing craft vehicle and personnel (LCVP) or four landing craft mechanized (LCM) or one landing craft utility and one LCVP. Normally, they operate with four LCM-1E craft. However, a maximum of 170 vehicles can be carried depending on size. Galicia can transport 543 fully-equipped troops and 72 staff and aircrew.

The LPDs are armed with two Oerlikon Contraves  cannon but can be fitted with four. They also mount six Sippican Hycor SRBOC MK36 chaff launchers. The Galicia class is equipped with KH 1007 air/surface search radar and AN/TPX-54 (V) Mk-XII (mode 4) identification friend or foe. Galicia has a complement of 115 with capacity for an additional 12 personnel.

Construction and career
Ordered on 29 July 1994, the vessel's keel was laid down on 31 May 1996 at the Empresa Nacional Bazán shipyards in Ferrol. Named Galicia for the autonomous community of Spain, the LPD was launched on 21 July 1997 and was commissioned by the Spanish Navy (Armada Española) on 30 April 1998.

Galicia performed humanitarian aid operations to Central America following Hurricane Mitch from November 1998 to January 1999. The vessel took part in the cleanup following the wreck of the tanker  and the resulting oil spill from December 2002 to February 2003. From January to April 2005, Galicia was deployed to provide humanitarian aid in Iraq.

Galicia took part in Operation Respuesta Solidaria in Banda Aceh after the tsunami in northwestern Sumatra. This was followed by Operation Libre Hidalgo in support of United Nations peacekeeping in Lebanon. The LPD made two deployments, one in 2010 and another in 2011, as part of Operation Atalanta fighting piracy in the Indian Ocean and off the coast of Somalia. In April 2020, Galicia was deployed to Melilla, Spain to aid the city in the fight against COVID-19.

Notes

Citations

References

External links

 Buque de Asalto Anfibio Clase Galicia L-51 y Castilla L-52 (In Spanish)
 Landing Platform Docks LPD / In Spanish Buque de Asalto Anfibio (In Spanish)

1997 ships
Amphibious warfare vessels of Spain
Galicia-class landing platform docks
Ships built in Spain